Beatriz Cienfuegos (1701-1786) was a Spanish editor and journalist. She was the founder and publisher of the La Pensadora Gaditana (1763), the first paper edited by a woman in Spain, and has been referred to as the first Spanish journalist.

See also
 List of women printers and publishers before 1800

References 

18th-century Spanish women writers
18th-century printers
18th-century publishers (people)
1701 births
1786 deaths
18th-century Spanish journalists
18th-century Spanish businesspeople
18th-century women journalists